Heteroteuthis weberi is a species of bobtail squid native to the Indo-Pacific waters off central Indonesia.

The type specimen was collected off Indonesia and is deposited at the Muséum National d'Histoire Naturelle in Paris.

References

External links 

Bobtail squid
Molluscs described in 1902
Taxobox binomials not recognized by IUCN